Vossius may refer to:

 Gerardus Vossius (1577–1649), a Dutch humanist
 Dionysius Vossius (1612–1633), a Dutch translator, son of Gerardus Vossius
 Isaac Vossius (1618–1689), a Dutch scholar, son of Gerardus Vossius
 Vossius Gymnasium in Amsterdam, named after Gerardus Vossius
 Adolf Vossius,  German ophthalmologist
 Vossius ring, a form of eye trauma
 Vossius (restaurant), a former Dutch Michelin starred restaurant
 Vossius (beetle), a beetle genus in the tribe Tropiphorini

See also 
 Voss (surname), the Anglicized form of Vossius
 Voss (disambiguation)